The 2022 Southern Jaguars football team represented Southern University as a member of the Southwestern Athletic Conference (SWAC) during the 2022 NCAA Division I FCS football season. They were led by head coach Eric Dooley, who was coaching his first season with the program. The Jaguars played their home games at A. W. Mumford Stadium in Baton Rouge, Louisiana.

Schedule
Southern finalized their 2022 schedule on February 1, 2022.

Game summaries

Florida Memorial

at LSU

vs. Texas Southern

Arkansas–Pine Bluff

at Prairie View A&M

Alcorn State

Virginia–Lynchburg

at No. 9 Jackson State

at Florida A&M

Mississippi Valley State

vs. Grambling State

at No. 10 Jackson State (SWAC Championship)

References

Southern Jaguars
Southern Jaguars football seasons
Southern Jaguars